The Bangladesh women's national cricket team is the team that represents the country of Bangladesh in international women's cricket matches. They made their international debut when they played, and won, two matches against Thailand in July 2007 before participating in and winning the 2007 ACC Women's Tournament. Bangladesh were granted One-Day International (ODI) status in 2011 after finishing fifth in the 2011 Women's Cricket World Cup Qualifier. They subsequently qualified for the 2014 ICC Women's World Twenty20, making their first appearance at a top-level women's international tournament. They have also won the 2018 edition of  ACC Women's Asia Cup.This was the only instance in ACC Women's Asia Cup where any team other than India has won the cup.However,they finished fifth in the next edition (2022 edition) of Women's Asia Cup

On 24 November 2011, Bangladesh was granted ODI status after defeating USA by 9 wickets in the 2011 Women's Cricket World Cup Qualifier. This win against USA guaranteed that Bangladesh would finish in the top 6 in the tournament and thus be ranked in the top 10 globally, which was the requirement for attaining ODI status. In April 2021, the ICC awarded permanent Test and One Day International (ODI) status to all full member women's teams.

History

2007 ACC Women's Tournament

Gain ODI status

2016 Ireland tour

2017 ICC Women's Cricket World Cup

2018 Women's Twenty20 Asia Cup 

Bangladesh Women's National Cricket Team has been the only team (other than India) to have won an Asia Cup Title.

2022 ICC Women's Cricket World Cup 
Bangladesh made their debut at the ICC Women's Cricket World Cup in 2022, qualifying on the basis of their WODI ranking after the qualifying tournament was abandoned during the group stage, with Bangladesh having a 2–1 record at the point of abandonment, with wins over Pakistan and the US, and a loss to Thailand. They would go on to finish 7th with a 1–6 record, with a win over Pakistan. As a result of their qualification for the World Cup, they also qualified for the 2022–2025 ICC Women's Championship.

Current squad
This lists all the players who were named in the most recent ODI or T20I squad. Updated as of 10 October 2022.

Former players

Coaching staff

Tournament history

World Cup

World T20

Asia Cup

One-Day Internationals

Twenty20 Internationals

Asian Games

South Asian Games

Others
ACC Women's Tournament
2007: Champions

ICC Women's World Twenty20 Qualifier
 2015: Runners-up (Q)
 2018: Champions (Q)
 2019: Champions (Q)
 2022: Champions (Q)

ICC Women's World Twenty20
 2014: First Round
 2016: First Round
 2018: First Round

ICC Women's Cricket World Cup Qualifier
 2011: 5th
 2017: 5th
 2020:(Q)

 Host of the tournament in Bold

Honours

ACC
Women's Asia Cup:
 Champions (1): 2018

Others
Asian Games
 Silver Medal (2): 2010, 2014
South Asian Games
 Gold Medal (1): 2019

Records and statistics

International Match Summary — Bangladesh Women

As of 21 February 2023

Women's One-Day Internationals
Highest team total: 234/7 v. Pakistan on 13 March 2022.
Highest individual innings: 75*, Salma Khatun v. India on 8 April 2013 at Sardar Patel Stadium, Ahmedabad.
Best innings bowling: 6/20, Khadija Tul Kubra v. Pakistan on 8 October 2018 at Sheikh Kamal International Stadium, Cox's Bazar.

Most ODI runs for Bangladesh Women

Most ODI wickets for Bangladesh Women

Highest individual innings in Women's ODI

Best bowling figures in an innings in Women's ODI

ODI record versus other nations

Records complete to Women ODI #1308. As of 17 December 2022.

Women's Twenty20 Internationals
Highest team total: 255/2 v. Maldives on 5 December 2019 at Pokhara Stadium, Pokhara.
Highest individual innings: 113*, Nigar Sultana v. Maldives on 5 December 2019 at Pokhara Stadium, Pokhara.
Best innings bowling: 5/12, Nahida Akter v. Kenya on 19 January 2022 at Kinrara Academy Oval, Kuala Lumpur.

Most T20I runs for Bangladesh Women

Most T20I wickets for Bangladesh Women

Highest individual innings in Women's T20I

Best bowling figures in an innings in Women's T20I

T20I record versus other nations

Records complete to WT20I #1375. As of 21 February 2023.

See also
List of Bangladesh women ODI cricketers
List of Bangladesh women Twenty20 International cricketers
Bangladesh national cricket team

References

External links

 
Women's cricket in Bangladesh
Women's national cricket teams
Women
2007 establishments in Bangladesh